Awake -Evoke the Urge- is the second studio album by metal band Deathgaze. It is the first full-length album featuring Ai as their vocalist and Kosuke as their new bassist.

In support of the new album, the band toured nationwide in Japan from November 2008 to March 2009. It is their second major tour.

Track listing

References

External links
DEATHGAZE Official band website
DEATHGAZE Official MySpace profile
Enter Brain Official label site

Deathgaze albums
2008 albums